Limaformosa is a genus of snakes, commonly known as file snakes, in the family Lamprophiidae. The genus is endemic to Africa.

Etymology
The generic name, Limaformosa, is from Latin lima meaning "file" +  formosa meaning "beautifully formed".

Species
There are six recognized species in the genus:

Limaformosa capensis  – Cape file snake
Limaformosa chanleri  – unicolor file snake
Limaformosa crossi  – Crosse's file snake
Limaformosa guirali  – Mocquard's file snake
Limaformosa savorgnani  – Congo file snake
Limaformosa vernayi  – Angolan file snake

Nota bene: A binomial authority in parentheses indicates that the species was originally described in a genus other than Limaformosa.

References

Further reading
Boulenger GA (1893). Catalogue of the Snakes in the British Museum (Natural History). Volume I., Containing the Families ... Colubridæ Aglyphæ, part. London: Trustees of the British Museum (Natural History). (Taylor and Francis, printers). xiii + 448 pp. + Plates I-XXVIII. (Gonionotophis, new genus, p. 323).
Branch, Bill (2004). Field Guide to Snakes and other Reptiles of Southern Africa. Sanibel Island, Florida: Ralph Curtis Books. 399 pp. . (Genus Mehelya, p. 78).
Broadley, Donald G.; Tolley, Krystal A.; Conradie, Werner; Wishart, Sarah; Trape, Jean-François; Burger, Marius; Kusamba, Chifundera; Zassi-Boulou, Ange-Ghislain; Greenbaum, Eli (2018). "A phylogeny and genus-level revision of the African file snakes Gonionotophis Boulenger (Squamata: Lamprophiidae)". African Journal of Herpetology 67 (1): 43–60. (Limaformosa, new genus).

Lamprophiidae
Snake genera